Line 4 of Shenzhen Metro, formerly branded as Longhua line, runs South–North from  to . The line serves Futian District and Longhua District of Shenzhen.

The line originally used 4-car trains, making it extremely crowded although it still carried over 250,000 people daily peaking at 516,100 on 5 May 2014. Stations feature electronic passenger information systems which display estimated train arrival times.

When the second phase of the line opened in 2011, there were only eight trains which were completely unable to meet passenger demand. By 2012, 24 trains were in service. On 26 January 2014, the first 6-car train entered service, and as of 30 January 2015 all trains are 6 cars; 2 months earlier than planned.

The line is currently coloured , although it was originally coloured  until 1 July 2010.

Operation by MTR

Line 4's operation and management was handed over to MTR Corporation (Shenzhen), a subsidiary of MTR Corporation on 1 July 2010 (for 30 years, until 2040) under a BOT basis. Upon MTR's takeover, elements of the existing stations were modified to match MTR Hong Kong's styles, such as changing of lighting, station maps and signs, posters and the introduction of station art similar to those found within stations in the Hong Kong MTR. English station names were also modified (i.e. 'Futiankouan' changed to 'Futian Checkpoint') for easier recognition, and staff uniform and help desks were also changed to match the styles seen in Hong Kong's MTR.

The English font type and tickets remain unchanged.

MTR Fare Saver 

History

Service routes
  — 
  —  (Working days peak hours only)

Stations

Rolling Stock

References

Shenzhen Metro lines
Railway lines opened in 2004
MTR Corporation